Tippu Tip, or Tippu Tib (1832 – June 14, 1905), real name Ḥamad ibn Muḥammad ibn Jumʿah ibn Rajab ibn Muḥammad ibn Saʿīd al Murjabī, was an Afro-Omani ivory and slave trader, explorer, governor and plantation owner. He worked for a succession of the sultans of Zanzibar and was the Sultan of Uterera, a short-lived state in Kasongo, Maniema ruled by himself and his son Sefu who was an Emir with local WaManyema.

Tippu Tip traded in slaves for Zanzibar's clove plantations. As part of the large and lucrative trade, he led many trading expeditions into Central Africa, constructing profitable trading posts deep into the Congo Basin region and thus becoming the most well-known slave trader in Africa, supplying much of the world with black slaves.

He also bought the ivory from WaManyema suppliers in Kasongo, the capital of the Sultanate of Utetera, and resold it for a profit at coastal ports.

Early life
Based on descriptions of his age at different points in his life, it is believed that Tippu Tip was born around 1832 in Zanzibar. Tippu Tip's mother, Bint Habib bin Bushir, was a Muscat Arab of the ruling class. His father and paternal grandfather were coastal Arabs of the Swahili Coast who had taken part in the earliest trading expeditions to the interior. His paternal great-grandmother, wife of Rajab bin Mohammed bin Said el Murgebi, was the daughter of Juma bin Mohammed el Nebhani, a member of a respected Muscat (Oman) family, and a Bantu woman from the village of Mbwa Maji, a small village south of what would later become the German capital of Dar es Salaam. 

Throughout his lifetime Hamad bin Muhammad bin Juma bin Rajab el Murjebi was more commonly known as Tippu Tib, which translates to "the gatherer together of wealth". According to him, he was given the nickname Tippu Tip after the "tiptip" sound that his guns gave off during expeditions in Chungu territory.

At a relatively young age, Tippu Tip led a group of about 100 men into Central Africa seeking slaves and ivory. After plundering several large swathes of land, he returned to Zanzibar to consolidate his resources and recruit for his forces. Following this he returned to mainland Africa.

Later life
Tippu Tip built a trading empire, using the proceeds to establish clove plantations on Zanzibar. Abdul Sheriff reported that when he left for his twelve years of "empire building" on the mainland, he had no plantations of his own. By 1895, he had acquired "seven 'shambas' [plantations] and 10,000 slaves".

He met and helped several famous western explorers of the African continent, including David Livingstone and Henry Morton Stanley. Between 1884 and 1887 he claimed the Eastern Congo for himself and for the Sultan of Zanzibar, Bargash bin Said el Busaidi. In spite of his position as protector of Zanzibar's interests in Congo, he managed to maintain good relations with the Europeans. When, in August 1886, fighting broke out between the Swahili and the representatives of King Leopold II of Belgium at Stanley Falls, al-Murjabī went to the Belgian consul at Zanzibar to assure him of his "good intentions". Although he was still a force in Central African politics, he could see by 1886 that power in the region was shifting.

Governor of the Stanley Falls District
 in early 1887, Stanley arrived in Zanzibar and proposed that Tippu Tip be made governor of the Stanley Falls District in the Congo Free State. Both Leopold and Sultan Barghash bin Said of Zanzibar agreed and on February 24, 1887, Tippu Tip accepted. At the same time, he agreed to man the expedition which Stanley had been commissioned to organize for the purpose of rescuing Emin Pasha (E. Schnitzer), the German governor of Equatoria (a region of Ottoman Egypt, today in South Sudan) who had been stranded in the Bahr el Ghazal area as a result of the Mahdi uprising in Sudan.

Tippu Tip travelled back to the Upper Congo in the company of Stanley, but this time by way of the Atlantic coast and up the Congo River. Aside from its doubtful usefulness, the relief expedition was marred by the near annihilation of its rearguard, a disaster for which Stanley attempted to place the blame on Tippu Tip.

Congo–Arab War
After his tenure as governor, the Congo–Arab War broke out. Both sides fought with armies consisting mostly of local African soldiers fighting under the command of either Arab or European leaders. 

When Tippu Tip left the Congo, the authority of King Leopold's Free State was still very weak in the Eastern parts of the territory and the power lay largely with local Arabic or Swahili strongmen. Amongst these were Tippu Tip's son Sefu bin Hamid and a trader known as Rumaliza in the area close to Lake Tanganyika.  

In 1892, Sefu bin Hamed attacked Belgian ivory traders, who were seen as a threat to the Arab-Swahili trade. The Free State government sent a force under commander Francis Dhanis to the East. Dhanis had an early success when the African warlord Ngongo Lutete changed sides from Sefu's to his. The better armed and organised Belgian force defeated their opponents in several fights until the death of Sefu on 20 October 1893, and finally forcing also Rumaliza to flee to German territory in 1895.

Death

After returning to Zanzibar around 1890/91, Tippu Tip retired. He set out to write an account of his life, which is the first example of the literary genre of autobiography in the Bantu Swahili language. Dr. Heinrich Brode, who knew him in Zanzibar, transcribed the manuscript into Roman script and translated it into German. It was subsequently translated into English and published in Britain in 1907.

Tippu Tip died June 13, 1905, of malaria (according to Brode) in his home in Stone Town, the main town on the island of Zanzibar.

References

Sources
 
 
 
 
 Maisha ya Hamed bin Mohammed el Murjebi yaani Tippu Tip kwa maneno yake mwenyewe, kimefasiriwa na W.H. Whitely (toleo la Kiswahili - Kiingereza), East Africa Literature Bureau 1974
 
 Sheriff, Abdul. Slaves, Spices & Ivory in Zanzibar: Integration of an East African Commercial Empire into the World Economy, 1770-1873. London, Nairobi, Tanzania, Athens,OH: James Currey, Heinemann Kenya, Tanzania Publishing House, Ohio University Press, 1987.

External links

Zanzibari people
African slave traders
Arab slave traders
19th century in Zanzibar
1832 births
1905 deaths
African warlords
Deaths from malaria
Infectious disease deaths in Tanzania
Congo Free State
History of Central Africa
History of Zanzibar
Tanzanian people of Omani descent
19th-century African businesspeople
Congo Free State people
19th-century Arabs
19th-century Omani people
Arab explorers
Slave traders of Zanzibar
Slavery in Oman